This list of prehistoric echinoderms is an attempt to create a comprehensive listing of all genera that have ever been included in the Echinoderms that have been preserved as fossils. This list excludes purely vernacular terms. It includes all commonly accepted genera, but also genera that are now considered invalid, doubtful (nomina dubia), or were not formally published (nomina nuda), as well as junior synonyms of more established names, and genera that are no longer considered echinoderms.

The list includes thousands of genera.

Extinct genera are marked with a dagger (†).
Extant genera are bolded.

Naming conventions and terminology
Naming conventions and terminology follow the International Code of Zoological Nomenclature. Technical terms used include:
 Junior synonym: A name which describes the same taxon as a previously published name. If two or more genera are formally designated and the type specimens are later assigned to the same genus, the first to be published (in chronological order) is the senior synonym, and all other instances are junior synonyms. Senior synonyms are generally used, except by special decision of the ICZN, but junior synonyms cannot be used again, even if deprecated. Junior synonymy is often subjective, unless the genera described were both based on the same type specimen.
Nomen nudum (Latin for "naked name"): A name that has appeared in print but has not yet been formally published by the standards of the ICZN. Nomina nuda (the plural form) are invalid, and are therefore not italicized as a proper generic name would be. If the name is later formally published, that name is no longer a nomen nudum and will be italicized on this list. Often, the formally published name will differ from any nomina nuda that describe the same specimen.
Nomen oblitum (Latin for "forgotten name"): A name that has not been used in the scientific community for more than fifty years after its original proposal.
Preoccupied name: A name that is formally published, but which has already been used for another taxon. This second use is invalid (as are all subsequent uses) and the name must be replaced. As preoccupied names are not valid generic names, they will also go unitalicized on this list.
Nomen dubium (Latin for "dubious name"): A name describing a fossil with no unique diagnostic features. As this can be an extremely subjective and controversial designation, this term is not used on this list.

A

†Aacocrinus
†Aaglacrinus
†Aatocrinus
†Abacocrinus
†Abactinocrinus
†Abathocrinus
†Abatocrinus
†Abatus
†Abertella
†Abludoglyptocrinus
†Abrachiocrinus
†Abrotocrinus
†Abyssocrinus
†Acacocrinus
†Acanthechinus
†Acanthocaudina
†Acanthocrinus
†Acanthocystites
†Acantholepis
†Acanthotheelia
†Acariaeocrinus
†Acariaiocrinus
†Acentrotremites
†Achistrum
†Achradocrinus
†Achradocystites
†Acinetaster
†Acolocrinus
†Acriaster
†Acrocidaris
†Acrocrinus
†Acrolusia
†Acropeltis
†Acrosalenia
†Acrosaster
†Actinocrinites
†Actinophyma
†Acuticarpus
†Acutisclerus
†Acylocrinus
†Adacrinus
†Adinocrinus
†Adocetocystis
†Adoketocarpus
†Aduncrum
†Advenaster
†Adytaster
†Aenigmocrinus
†Aeolopneustes
†Aepyaster
†Aesiocrinus
†Aethocrinus
†Aexitrophocrinus
†Affinocrinus
†Afraster
†Agalmaster
†Aganaster
†Agaricocrinus
†Agassizia
†Agassizocrinus
†Agathocrinus
†Agelacrinites
†Aglaocrinus
†Agmoblastus
†Agnostocrinus
†Agostocrinus
†Aguayoaster
†Ailsacrinus
†Ainacrinus
†Ainigmacrinus
†Aithriocrinus
†Akadocrinus
†Albebarania
†Albertechinus
†Alcimocrinus
†Alexandrites
†Alisocrinus
†Alkaida
†Allagecrinus
†Allanicytidium
†Allionia
†Allocatillocrinus
†Allocentrotus
†Allocrinus
†Allocystites
†Allomma
†Alloprosallocrinus
†Allosocrinus
†Allosycocrinus
†Allotoxaster
†Allozygocrinus
†Alpicidaris
†Alsopocrinus
†Altairia
†Amaltheocrinus
†Amarsupiocrinus
†Ambicocrinus
†Ambipleurus
†Amblacrinus
†Amblypgus
Amblypneustes
†Ambolostoma
†Amecystis
†Ammonicrinus
†Ammotrophus
†Amonohexacrinus
†Amoraster
†Ampelocrinus
†Ampheristocrinus
†Amphicrinus
†Amphiope
†Amphiophiura
†Amphioplus
†Amphipsalidocrinus
†Amphitriodites
†Amphoracrinus
†Amphoracrocrinus
†Amphoracystis
†Amphorometra
†Ampullaster
†Ampurocrinus
†Amygdalocystites
†Amygdalotheca
†Anaglyptocrinus
†Anamesocrinus
†Anarchocrinus
†Anartiocrinus
†Anartiocystis
†Anatiferopsis
†Anaulocidaris
†Ancalocrinus
†Anchicrinus
†Ancistrocrinus
†Ancoracrinus
†Ancylocidaris
†Ancyrocrinus
†Andenothyone
†Anechocrinus
†Anemetocrinus
†Angioblastus
†Anglidiscus
†Angulatoblastus
†Angulocrinus
†Anisaser
†Anisocidaris
†Anisocrinus
†Anobasicrinus
†Anomalocrinus
†Anomalocystites
†Anorthaster
†Anorthopygus
†Anthemocrinus
†Anthoblastus
†Anthracocrinus
†Antihomocrinus
†Antillaster
†Antiquaster
†Anulocrinus
†Aorocrinus
†Apatopygus
†Aphelaster
†Aphelecrinus
†Apiocrinites
†Apiocystites
†Aplocoma
†Apodactylocrinus
†Apodasmocrinus
†Apographiocrinus
†Apoxypetalum
†Applinocrinus
†Aptilechinus
†Apurocrinus
†Apycnodiscus
†Arachniopleurus
†Arachnocrinus
†Arachnocystites
†Arachnoides
†Araeocrinus
†Araeosoma
†Arbacia
†Arbacina
†Arbia (genus)
†Archaechinus
†Archaeocalyptocrinus
†Archaeocidaris
†Archaeocothurnus
†Archaeocrinus
†Archaeoisocrinus
†Archaeometra
†Archaeophiomusium
†Archaepyrgus
†Archaetaxocrinus
†Archaster
†Archegocystis
†Archegonaster
†Archiacia
†Archophiactis
†Arcuoblastus
†Arenorbis
†Argentinaster
†Argoviaster
†Arisaigaster
†Aristocystites
†Arkacrinus
†Arkarua?
†Arkonaster
†Armathyraster
†Armenocrinus
†Arnaudaster
†Arrectocrinus
†Arroyocrinus
†Arthraster
†Arthroacantha
†Artichthyocrinus
†Artuschisma
†Aryballocrinus
†Asaphechinus
†Asaphocrinus
†Ascetocrinus
†Ascocystites
†Aspidaster
†Aspidocarpus
†Aspidocrinus
†Aspiduriella
†Asterias
†Asteroblastus
†Asterocidaris
†Asterocystis
†asterometridae
†Asteronyx
†Asterostoma
†Asthenosoma
†Astriclypeus
†Astrocrinites
†Astrocrinus
†Astrocystites
†Astrodapsis
†Astrolampus
†Astropecten
†Astropygaulus
†Asymmetrocrinus
†Atactocrinus
†Atactus
†Ateleocystites
†Atelestocrinus
†Atelospatangus
†Athabascacrinus
†Athlocrinus
†Atlasaster
†Atokacrinus
†Atopechinus
†Atopocrinus
†Atractocrinus
†Atrapocrinus
†Atremacrinus
†Atyphocrinus
†Aulocolatiaster
†Aulactis
†Aulechinus
†Auliskocrinus
†Auloblastus
†Aulocrinus
†Aulodesocrinus
†Aurelianaster
†Aureocrinus
†Auricularites
†Austinocrinus
†Australanthus
†Australaster
†Australocystis
†Austroblastus
†Austrocidaris
†Azygocrinus

B

†Babinocystis
†Bactrocrinites
†Baculocystites
†Baerocrinus
†Balacrinus
†Balanocidaris
†Balanocrinus
†Balanocystites
†Balearocrinus
†Baliactis
†Barbieria
†Barnumia
†Barrandeocarpus
†Barrandeocrinus
†Barycrinus
†Basleocrinus
†Basseaster
†Bassleridiscus
†Basslerocystis
†Batalleria
†Bathericrinus
†Batherocystis
†Bathronocrinus
†Bathycrinus
†Bathysynactites
†Batocrinus
†Baueria
†Bdellacoma
†Becharocrinus
†Belanskicrinus
†Belemnocrinus
†Belemnocystites
†Belochthus
†Belocrinus
†Benthocrinus
†Benthopecten
†Beryllia
†Besairecidaris
†Betelgeusia
†Beyrichocrinus
†Bicidiocrinus
†Bihaticrinus
†Bikocrinus
†Bilecicrinus
†Billingsocystis
†Binoculites
†Bistomiacystis
†Blairocrinus
†Blastocystis
†Blastoidocrinus
†Blothrocrinus
†Bockia
†Bogotacrinus
†Bohemaster
†Bohemiaecystis
†Bohemicocrinus
†Bohemura
†Bokkeveldia
†Bolbocrinus
†Bolboporites
†Boletechinus
†Bolicrinus
†Boliviacrinus
†Bollandocrinus
†Bostryclavus
†Bothriocidaris
†Bothryopneutes
†Botryocrinus
†Bourgueticrinus
†Brabeocrinus
†Brachiocrinus
†Brachiomonocrinus
†Brachisolaster
†Brachyschisma
†Brahmacrinus
†Bramus
†Breynia
†Briarocrinus
†Bridgerocrinus
†Brightonia
†Brightonicystis
†Brisaster
†Briseocrinus
†Brisingella
†Brissolampas
†Brissomorpha
†Brissopatagus
†Brissopneustes
†Brissopsis
†Brissus
†Brochechinus
†Brochopleurus
†Brockocystis
†Bromidocrinus
†Bromidocystis
†Bronaughocrinus
†Bruennichometra
†Brutopisocrinus
†Brychiocrinus
†Buchicrinus
†Bulbocystis
†Burdigalocrinus
†Bursacrinus

C

†Cactocrinus
†Cadisocrinus
†Cadocrinus
†Caelocrinus
†Caenholectypus
†Caenocidaris
†Cagaster
†Cainocrinus
†Calamocrinus
†Calcancora
†Calcancorella
†Calcancoroidea
†Calceocrinus
†Calceolispongia
†Calclamna
†Calclamnella
†Calclamnoidea
†Calcligula
†Calclyra
†Caldenocrinus
†Caleidocrinus
†Caletaster
†Calilampus
†Calix
†Calliaster
†Calliasterella
†Calliderma
†Calliocrinus
†Callocystites
†Calocidaris
†Calpiocrinus
†Calycanthocrinus
†Calycoblastus
†Calycocrinus
†Calyptactis
†Camarocrinus
†Cambraster
†Cambroblastus
†Cambroblastus
†Cambrocrinus
†Camerogalerus
†Camptocrinus
†Camptostroma
†Campylostoma
†Canadocystis
†Canistrocrinus
†Cantharocrinus
†Capellia
†Capsicocrinus
†Carabocrinus
†Carcinocrinus
†Cardabia
†Cardiaster
†Cardiocystites
†Cardiolampas
†Cardiopelta
†Cardioserra
†Cardiotaxis
†Caribbaster
†Carlopsocrinus
†Carneyella
†Carolicrinus
†Carpenteroblastus
†Carpocrinus
†Carpocystites
†Caryoblastus
†Caryocrinites
†Caryocystites
†Cassidulus
†Castericystis
†Catactocrinus
†Cataraquicrinus
†Catatonocrinus
†Cathetocrinus
†Catillocrinus
†Catopygus
†Caucacrocrinus
†Cavanechinus
†Celonocrinus
†Celtocrinus
†Cenocrinus
†Cenomanaster
†Centriocrinus
†Centropygus
†Centrostephanus
†Ceramaster
†Cerasmocrinus
†Ceratoblastus
†Ceratocrinus
†Ceratocystis
†Cercidocrinus
†Certonardoa
†Cestobrissus
†Cestocrinus
†Chaetasterina
†Chaivella
†Changninocrinus
†Charactocrinus
†Chariaster
†Charientocrinus
†Chariocrinus
†Chatsworthia
†Chauvelia
†Chauvelicystis
†Cheirocrinus
†Cheirocystella
†Cheirocystis
†Cheiropteraster
†Chelocrinus
†Chelonechinus
†Cheopsia
†Chinacrinus
†Chinianaster
†Chinianocarpos
†Chirocrinus
†Chiropinna
†Chladocrinus
†Chlidonocrinus
†Cholaster
†Cholocrinus
†Chomataster
†Chondrocidaris
†Chuniola
†Cibaster
†Cibolocrinus
†Cicerocrinus
†Cidaris
†Cidaropsis
†Cigara
†Cincinnaticrinus
†Cincinnatidiscus
†Cionobrissus
†Circopeltis
†Clarkeaster
†Clarkeocrinus
†Clathrocrinus
†Clavallus
†Claviaster
†Claviculacrinus
†Clavidiscus
†Cleiocrinus
†Cleistechinus
†Cleistocrinus
†Clematocrinus
†Clidochirus
†Clistocrinus
†Clonocrinus
†Closterocrinus
†Cluniaster
†Clypeanthus
Clypeaster
†Clypeolampas
†Clypeopygus
†Clypeus
†Cnemidactis
†Coccaster
†Codaster
†Codechinus
†Codiacrinus
†Codiacystis
†Codiopsis
†Coeliocrinus
†Coelocrinus
†Coelocystis
†Coelometra
†Coelopleurus
†Coenocystis
†Coleicarpus
†Collbatothuria
†Colliclypeus
†Collyrites
†Collyropsis
†Colpodecrinus
†Colpotiara
†Columbicrinus
†Columbocystis
†Comanthocrinus
†Comarocystites
†Comaster
†Comatulina
†Compagicrinus
†Compsaster
†Compsocrinus
†Comptonia
†Condylocrinus
†Conisia
†Conoclypus
†Conocrinus
†Conoideocrinus
†Conometra
†Contignatindocrinus
†Contocrinus
†Conuloblastus
†Conulus
†Coollarocrinus
†Cooperidiscus
†Coptodiscus
†Coraster
†Cordyloblastus
†Cordylocrinus
†Corechinus
†Corematocrinus
†Cornucrinus
†Corocrinus
†Coronocrinus
†Coronocystis
†Corthya
†Corylocrinus
†Corynecrinus
†Coryslus
†Corythocrinus
†Cosmatites
†Cosmetocrinus
†Cosmocrinus
†Costalocrinus
†Costatoblastus
†Costigerites
†Cothurnocystis
†Cottaldia
†Cotteaudia
†Cottreauaster
†Cottreaucorys
†Cotylacrina
†Cotylederma
†Cradeocrinus
†Cranocrinus
†Craspedocrinus
†Crataegocrinus
†Crateraster
†Craterocrinus
†Cravenechinus
†Cremacrinus
†Crepidosoma
†Cribanocrinus
†Cribroblastus
†Cricocrinus
†Crinerocrinus
†Crinobrachiatus
†Crinocidaris
†Cromyocrinus
†Croneisites
†Crotalocrinites
†Crucibrissus
†Crucivirga
†Cryphiocrinus
†Cryptanisocrinus
†Cryptechinus
†Cryptoblastus
†Cryptocrinites
†Cryptogoleus
†Cryptoschisma
†Ctenocrinus
†Ctenocystis
†Ctenophoraster
†Cubanaster
†Cucumarites
†Culicocrinus
†Culmicrinus
†Cunctocrinus
†Cuneaster
†Cuniculocystis
†Cupressocrinites
†Cupulocorona
†Cupulocrinus
†Curteocrinus
†Curvatella
†Curvitriordo
†Cusacrinus
†Cyamidia
†Cyathidium
†Cyathocidaris
†Cyathocrinites
†Cyathocystis
†Cyathotheca
†Cyclaster
†Cyclocrinus
†Cyclocystoides
†Cyclolampas
†Cydonocrinus
†Cydrocrinus
†Cylicocrinus
†Cyliocrinus
†Cymbiocrinus
†Cymbionites
†Cypelometra
†Cyphocrinus
†Cyrtocrinus
†Cystaster
†Cystoblastus
†Cytidocrinus
†Cytocrinus
†Cyttarocrinus

D

†Dactylocrinus
†Dactylocystis
†Dadocrinus
†Daedalocrinus
†Dalejocystis
†Daradaster
†Darraghcrinus
†Dasciocrinus
†Dazhucrinus
†Decacystis
†Decadocrinus
†Decameros
†Decaschisma
†Decemoblastus
†Dehmicystis
†Deliablastus
†Delocidaris
†Delocrinus
†Deltacrinus
†Deltacystis
†Deltadiscus
†Deltoblastus
†Democrinus
†Denarioacrocrinus
†Denariocrinus
†Dendraster
†Dendrocrinus
†Dendrocystites
†Dendrocystoides
†Denebia
†Deneechinus
†Dentiblastus
†Denticrinus
†Deocrinus
†Depaocrinus
†Derbiocrinus
†Dermaster
†Desmacriocrinus
†Desmechinus
†Desmidocrinus
†Desorella
†Destombesia
†Devonaster
†Devonistella
†Devonoblastus
†Devonocidaris
†Diabolocrinus
†Diadema
†Diademopsis
†Dialutocrinus
†Dialyaster
†Diamenocrinus
†Diamphidiocystis
†Diaphorocrinus
†Diatorocrinus
†Dibrachiocrinus
†Dichocrinus
†Dichostreblocrinus
†Dicirrocrinus
†Diclidaster
†Dicromyocrinus
†Dictenocrinus
†Dictyopleurus
†Dictyothurites
†Dicyclocidaris
†Dieuryocrinus
†Difficilicrinus
†Dilatocrinus
†Dimerocrinites
†Dinacrocrinus
†Dinardocrinus
†Dinocystis
†Dinotocrinus
†Diphuicrinus
†Diplechinus
†Diploblastus
†Diplocidaris
†Diplocrinus
†Diplodetus
†Diplopodia
†Diploporaster
†Diplosalenia
†Diplotagma
†Dipteroblastus
†Disaster
†Discholectypus
†Discocrinus
†Discocystis
†Discoides
†Discometra
†Displodocrinus
†Distefanaster
†Ditremaster
†Dixieus
†Dixonia
†Dizygocrinus
†Dolatocrinus
†Dolerocrinus
†Dolichoblastus
†Dolichocrinus
†Doliocrinus
†Domechinus
†Domfrontia
†Doreckicrinus
†Dorocidaris
†Doryblastus
†Dorycrinus
†Douvillaster
†Drepanaster
†Drepanocarpos
†Drymocrinus
†Dubarechinus
†Dulanocrinus
†Dumblea
†Duncaniaster
†Duncanicrinus
†Dunnicrinus
†Duperieria
†Durhamella
†Dwortsowaecrinus
†Dystactocrinus

E

†Echicrinus
†Echinanthus
†Echinarachnius
†Echinaster
†Echinasterella
†Echinocardium
†Echinocorys
†Echinocyamus
†Echinocyphus
†Echinocyphus
†Echinocystites
†Echinodiscus
†Echinoencrinites
†Echinogalerus
†Echinolampas
†Echinometra
†Echinoneus
†Echinopedina
†Echinopsis
†Echinosphaerites
†Echinostrephus
†Echinothuria
†Echinotiara
†Echinus
†Echmatocrinus
†Eckidocrinus
†Ectenocrinus
†Ectinechinus
†Ectocrinus
†Edapocrinus
†Edrioaster
†Edriocrinus
†Edriodiscus
†Edriophus
†Eidosocrinus
†Eifelocrinus
†Eireocrinus
†Eirmocrinus
†Elaeacrinus
†Eleutherocrinus
†Elgerius
†Elibatocrinus
†Elicrinus
†Ellipsechinus
†Ellipticoblastus
†Elpasocrinus
†Elpidocrinus
†Embryocrinus
†Emperocrinus
†Enallocrinus
†Enallopneustes
†Enascocrinus
†Encope
†Encrinaster
†Encrinus
†Endelocrinus
†Endeodiadema
†Engelia
†Enichaster
†Enoploura
†Entomaster
†Eoactis
†Eocamptocrinus
†Eocaudina
†Eocicerocrinus
†Eocomatula
†Eocystites
†Eodiadema
†Eogaleropygus
†Eohalysiocrinus
†Eoindocrinus
†Eokainaster
†Eomyelodactylus
†Eoparisocrinus
†Eopatelliocrinus
†Eophiura
†Eopilidiocrinus
†Eopinnacrinus
†Eosalenia
†Eoscutella
†Eoscutum
†Eospondylus
†Eostella
†Eothuria
†Eperisocrinus
†Epiaster
†Epihalysiocrinus
†Epipaston
†Epipetschoracrinus
†Eratocrinus
†Erbechinus
†Eretmocrinus
†Erinocystis
†Erisocrinus
†Espanocrinus
†Esthonocrinus
†Estonocystis
†Ethelocrinus
†Etheridgella
†Etoctenocystis
†Eucalyptocrinites
†Eucatillocrinus
†Eucidaris
†Eucladia
†Eucladocrinus
†Eucystis
†Eudesicrinus
†Eudimerocrinus
†Euerisocrinus
†Eugeniacrinites
†Euhydrodiskos
†Eumitrocystella
†Eumorphocrinus
†Eumorphocystis
†Euonychocrinus
†Eupachycrinus
†Eupatagus
†Euptychocrinus
†Eurhodia
†Euryoblastus
†Euryocrinus
†Eurypetalum
†Eurypneustes
†Eurysalenia
†Euspirocrinus
†Eustenocrinus
†Eustypocystis
†Eutaxocrinus
†Eutelecrinus
†Euthemon
†Eutretocystis
†Eutrochocrinus
†Euzonosoma
†Evechinus
†Exaetocrinus
†Exlinella
†Exochocrinus
†Exocrinus
†Exoriocrinus
†Exsulacrinus
†Exterocrinus

F

†Fanulodiscus
†Faorina
†Farquharsonia
†Faujasia
†Fauraster
†Fayoumaster
†Fellaster
†Fellius
†Fernandezaster
†Fibularia
†Fibulaster
†Fibulina
†Fifeocrinus
†Firmacidaris
†Fishericrinus
†Fissobractites
†Foerstecystis
†Foerstediscus
†Foliaster
†Follicrinus
†Fomalhautia
†Forbesiaster
†Forbesiocrinus
†Forthocrinus
†Fossulaster
†Fournierechinus
†Fourtaunia
†Frankocrinus
†Frizzellus
†Fungocystites
†Furcaster

G

†Gagaria
†Galateacrinus
†Galeaster
†Galeola
†Galeraster
†Galerites
†Galeroclypeus
†Galeropygus
†Galliaecystis
†Gammarocrinites
†Ganbirretia
†Garumnaster
†Gasterocoma
†Gastrocrinus
†Gaulocrinus
†Gaurocrinus
†Gauthieria
†Gauthiosoma
†Gazacrinus
†Gemmacrinus
†Gennaeocrinus
†Gentilia
†Geocoma
†Geraocrinus
†Germanasterias
†Geroldicrinus
†Gibbaster
†Giganticlavus
†Gilbertsocrinus
†Gillechinus
†Gillocystis
†Gilmocrinus
†Giraliaster
†Girvanaster
†Girvanicystis
†Gissocrinus
†Gitolampas
†Glansicystis
†Glaphyocrinus
†Glaphyrocystis
†Glaucocrinus
†Glaukosocrinus
†Glenotremites
†Globacrocrinus
†Globator
†Globoblastus
†Globocrinus
†Globulocystites
†Glossocrinus
†Glyphocyphus
†Glyphopneustes
†Glypotocidaris
†Glyptechinus
†Glypticus
†Glyptocrinus
†Glyptocyphus
†Glyptocystella
†Glyptocystites
†Glyptosphaerites
†Glyptosphaeronites
†Gnorimocrinus
†Gogia
†Goleocrinus
†Gomphechinus
†Gomphocystites
†Gongrochanus
†Gongrocrinus
†Gongyloblastus
†Goniocidaris
†Goniocrinus
†Goniophorus
†Goniopygus
†Goniosigma
†Gonzalezaster
†gorgonocephalid
†Gothocrinus
†Gotlandechinus
†Gracilechinus
†Graffhamicrinus
†Grammechinus
†Granatocrinus
†Granobrissoides
†Graphepleurus
†Graphiocrinus
†Grasia
†Grenprisia
†Griphocrinus
†Grypocrinus
†Gualtieria
†Guettardicrinus
†Guettaria
†Guichenocarpos
†Gustabilicrinus
†Gutticrinus
†Gymnocidaris
†Gymnocrinus
†Gymnodiadema
†Gyrocystis

H

†Habanaster
†Hadranderaster
†Hadroblastus
†Hadrochthus
†Hadrocrinus
†Hadrocystis
†Hadrodiscus
†Haereticotaxocrinus
†Haeretocrinus
†Hagenowia
†Hagnocrinus
†Haimea
†Hallaster
†Hallicystis
†Hallocrinus
†Halogetocrinus
†Halysiocrinus
†Hanusia
†Hapalocrinus
†Haplocrinites
†Haplosphaeronis
†Hardouinia
†Harmostocrinus
†Harrelicrinus
†Harrellicrinus
†Hattopsis
†Haughtonaster
†Hebeticrinus
†Heckericystis
†Helfriedella
†Helianthaster
†Heliaster
†Helicocrinus
†Helicocystis
†Helicoplacus
†Heliocidaris
†Heliocrinites
†Heliophora
†Heliosocrinus
†Helodiadema
†Hemiaster
†Hemibrachiocrinus
†Hemicara
†Hemicidaris
†Hemicosmites
†Hemicrinus
†Hemicystites
†Hemidiadema
†Hemieurylae
†Hemifaorina
†Hemigymnia
†Hemiindocrinus
†Hemimollocrinus
†Hemipedina
†Hemipneustes
†Hemisphaeranthos
†Hemistreptacron
†Hemistreptocrinus
†Hemithylus
†Hemitiaris
†Henicocystis
†Henricia
†Heracrinus
†Hercocrinus
†Hernandezaster
†Herpetocrinus
†Herreraster
†Hertha
†Hesperaster
†Hesperocystis
†Hessotiara
†Heteraster
†Heteroblastus
†Heterobrissus
†Heterocentrotus
†Heterocidaris
†Heterocrinus
†Heterocystites
†Heterodiadema
†Heterolampas
†Heterometra
†Heteropedina
†Heterosalenia
†Heteroschisma
†Hexacrinites
†Hexuraster
†Hikelaster
†Hillocystis
†Himerocrinus
†Himerometra
†Hippasteria
†Hippocystis
†Hirneacrinus
†Hirudocidaris
†Hispidocrinus
†Histocidaris
†Histocrinus
†Holaster
†Holcocrinus
†Holcopneustes
†Holectypus
†Hollowaycrinus
†Holmeseocrinus
†Holocrinus
†Holocystites
†Holopus
†Holothuropsis
†Holynocrinus
†Homalocrinus
†Homocrinus
†Homocystites
†Homoeaster
†Homoeopetalus
†Hoplocrinus
†Hormocrinus
†Hosieocrinus
†Houiblastus
†Hoyacrinus
†Hudsonaster
†Huniella
†Hunsrueckaster
†Hupea
†Huttonechinus
†Hyalocrinus
†Hyattechinus
†Hyboclypus
†Hybocrinus
†Hybocystites
†Hydreionocrinus
†Hydriocrinus
†Hydroporocrinus
†Hylodecrinus
†Hypechinus
†Hyperoblastus
†Hypocrinus
†Hypodiadema
†Hypopygurus
†Hyposalenia
†Hypselocrinus
†Hypsiclavus
†Hypsocrinus
†Hypsopatagus
†Hypsopygaster
†Hyrtanecrinus
†Hysteraster
†Hystrichopsydrax
†Hystrigaster
†Hystriyasterias

I

†Ibanocrinus
†Iberocrinus
†Ibexocrinus
†Icthyocrinus
†Idaeumocrinus
†Idiocidaris
†Idosocrinus
†Iheringiella
†Ilarionia
†Illemnocrinus
†Illusioluidia
†Ilmocrinus
†Imitatocrinus
†Implicaticystis
†Indiaster
†Indoblastus
†Indocrinus
†Infraclypeus
†Infulaster
†Intermediacrinus
†Inyocrinus
†Iocrinus
†Iowacystis
†Iraniaster
†Iranoblastus
†Irenechinus
†Isaster
†Isechinus
†Ismidaster
†Isocatillocrinus
†Isocrinus
†Isomicraster
†Isopetalum
†Isopneustes
†Isorophus
†Isorophusella
†Isotomocrinus
†Isselicrinus
†Iteacrinus
†Ivanovaecrinus

J

†Jacksonaster
†Jacquiertia
†Jaekelicrinus
†Jaekelocarpus
†Jaekelocystis
†Jaekelometra
†Jahnocrinus
†Jeannetia
†Jeronia
†Jimbacrinus
†Jordanocaudina
†Juglandocrinus
†Junggaroblastus
†Junocrinus

K

†Kadiskoblastus
†Kallimorphocrinus
†Kalpidocrinus
†Kanabinocrinus
†Kansacrinus
†Karlaster
†Katarocrinus
†Katoblastus
†Kazachstanoblastus
†Kentrospondylus
†Kephrenia
†Kertaster
†Kewia
†Kierechinus
†Kierocystis
Kina
†Kinzercystis
†Klasmura
†Kongielechinus
†Koninckocidaris
†Kooptoonocrinus
†Kopficrinus
†Kopficystis
†Kophinocrinus
†Kopriacrinus
†Koryschisma
†Kozurella
†Krama
†Krinocrinus
†Kroppocrinus
†Kuehnites
†Kylixocrinus
†Kyraster
†Kyreocrinus

L

†Labiocrinus
†Labrotaxis
†Laccocrinus
†Lacertasterias
†Laevigatocrinus
†Laevipatagus
†Laganum
†Lageniocrinus
†Lagynocystis
†Lajanaster
†Lambertechinus
†Lambertella
†Lambertiaster
†Lambertona
†Lampadaster
†Lampadocorys
†Lampadosocrinus
†Lampteroblastus
†Lampterocrinus
†Lanecrinus
†Lanieria
†Lanternarius
†Lanternocrinus
†Lanthanaster
†Lapillocystites
†Lapworthura
†Lasanocrinus
†Lasiocrinus
†Laticlypus
†Laubeocrinus
†Laudonocrinus
†Laurelocrinus
†Lebetocrinus
†Lebetodiscus
†Lecanocrinus
†Lecobasicrinus
†Lecocrinus
†Lecythiocrinus
†Lecythocrinus
†Ledidocidaris
†Lefortia
†Leiocyphus
†Leioechinus
†Leiopedina
†Leiostomaster
†Lekocrinus
†Lemennocrinus
†Lenicyamidia
†Leniechinus
†Lenita
†Lenneocrinus
†Lenticidaris
†Leocrinus
†Leodia
†Lepadocystis
†Lepidactis
†Lepidaster
†Lepidasterella
†Lepidasterina
†Lepidechinoides
†Lepidechinus
†Lepidesthes
†Lepidocalix
†Lepidocentrus
†Lepidoconia
†Lepidocystis
†Lepidodiscus
†Lepocrinites
†Leptechinus
†Leptocidaris
†Leptocystis
†Leptogonium
†Leptopleurus
†Leptosalenia
†Leptoschisma
†Lepyriactis
†Leurocidaris
†Levicidaris
†Leviechinus
†Lichenoides
†Liliocrinus
†Linckia
†Lingulocystis
†Linobrachiocrinus
†Linocrinus
†Linthia
†Liomolgocrinus
†Liparocrinus
†Lipsanocystis
†Lispidecodus
†Lithocrinus
†Litocrinus
†Lobalocrinus
†Lobomelocrinus
†Logocrinus
†Lonchocrinus
†Lopadiocrinus
†Lophaster
†Lophidiaster
†Lophoblastus
†Lophocrinus
†Loriolaster
†Loriolella
†Loriolia
†Loriolicrinus
†Loriolipedina
†Loriolometra
†Lotocrinus
†Lovenechinus
†Lovenia
†Lovenicystis
†Lovenilampas
†Loxocrinus
†Luhocrinus
†Luidia
†Lumectaster
†Lutetiaster
†Luxocrinus
†Lyonicrinus
†Lyricocarpus
†Lyriocrinus
†Lysocystites
†Lytechinus

M

†Macarocrinus
†Maccoya
†Macnamaratylus
†Macraster
†Macrocrinus
†Macrocystella
†Macrodiadema
†Macropneustes
†Macroporaster
†Macrostylocrinus
†Macurdablastus
†Maennilicrinus
†Magnosia
†Malaiocrinus
†Malchiblastus
†Maligneocrinus
†Malocystites
†Mandelacrinus
†Mandalacystis
†Manicrinus
†Manillacrinus
†Manticrinus
†Mantikosocrinus
†Maquoketocrinus
†Maragnicrinus
†Marathonocrinus
†Maretia
†Marginaster
†Marginura
†Margocrinus
†Marhoumacrinus
†Mariania
†Marjumicystis
†Marsupiocrinus
†Marsupites
†Martinechinus
†Mastaster
†Mastigactis
†Mastigocrinus
†Mastigophiura
†Mastoblastus
†Mathericrinus
†Mattsechinus
†Mauritanaster
†Mausoleaster
†Mazzettia
†Mediaster
†Medocechinus
†Medusaster
†Meekechinus
†Megacidaris
†Megaliocrinus
†Meganotocrinus
†Megapetalus
†Megapneustes
†Megaporocidaris
†Megistocrinus
†Melbacrinus
†Mellita
†Mellitella
†Melocrinites
†Melonechinus
†Menniscocrinus
†Menocidaris
†Menopygus
†Menuthiaster
†Meoma
†Mepygurus
†Mercedescaudina
†Meristocrinus
†Meristoschisma
†Merocidaris
†Merocrinus
†Merriamaster
†Mesoblastus
†Mesocystis
†Mesodiadema
†Mesodiadema
†Mesopalaeaster
†Mesotremaster
†Mespilocrinus
†Mespilocystites
†Messaoudia
†Metablastus
†Metabolocrinus
†Metacalceolispongia
†Metacatillocrinus
†Metacrinus
†Metacrocrinus
†Metacromyocrinus
†Metaeutelecrinus
†Metaffinocrinus
†Metaindocrinus
†Metalia
†Metallagecrinus
†Metaperimestocrinus
†Metaporinus
†Metasterocystis
†Metasycocrinus
†Methabocrinus
†Metholectypus
†Metichthyocrinus
†Metopaster
†Metutharocrinus
†Miatschkovocrinus
†Micradites
†Micraster
†Microantyx
†Microblastus
†Microcaracrinus
†Microcrinus
†Microcyphus
†Microdiadema
†Microlampas
†Micropedina
†Micropsis
†Mictocrinus
†Migliorinia
†Mikrocidarió
†Millericrinus
†Milonicystis
†Mimocystites
†Minervaecystis
†Minicidaris
†Minicrinus
†Minilyacrinus
†Miocidaris
†Miopentagonaster
†Miospondylus
†Miracrinus
†Mirechinus
†Mistia
†Mitrocrinus
†Mitrocystella
†Mitrocystites
†Moapocrinus
†Moenocrinus
†Moira
†Moiropsis
†Mokotibaster
†Mollocrinus
†Monachocrinus
†Monadoblastus
†Monaldicrinus
†Monaster
†Mongolocarpos
†Moniellocrinus
†Monilipsolus
†Monoblastus
†Monobrachiocrinus
†Monocycloides
†Monodiadema
†Monophoraster
†Monoschizablastus
†Monostychia
†Monstrocrinus
†Montanablastus
†Mooreocrinus
†Moronaster
†Morrowcrinus
†Mortensenaster
†Mortensenites
†Mortonella
†Moscovicrinus
†Moundocrinus
†Mundaster
†Murravechinus
†Musicrinus
†Mycocrinus
†Myeinocystites
†Myelodactylus
†Myriastiches
†Myrtillocrinus
†Mysticocrinus

N

†Nacocrinus
†Nactocrinus
†Nanicrinus
†Nannoblastus
†Nanocarpus
†Nanocrinus
†Narindechinus
†Nassoviocrinus
†Nasutocrinus
†Nebrashacrinus
†Necopinocrinus
†Neerkolocrinus
†Nehalemia
†Nemaster
†Neoarchaeocrinus
†Neobothriocidaris
†Neocamptocrinus
†Neocatacrinus
†Neocatillocrinus
†Neocatopygus
†Neocrinus
†Neodadocrinus
†Neodichocrinus
†Neoglobator
†Neoisorophusella
†Neolaganum
†Neolageniocrinus
†Neopalaeaster
†Neoplatycrinus
†Neoproraster
†Neoprotencrinus
†Neorumphia
†Neoschisma
†Neozeacrinus
†Nereocrinus
†Nevadacrinus
†Nevadaecystis
†Nevadocrinus
†Nexocrinus
†Nielsenicrinus
†Ninocrinus
†Nipponaster
†Nipponaster
†Nipterocrinus
†Nodoblastus
†Noetlingaster
†Nolichuckia
†Nonparactocrinus
†Nordenskjoeldaster
†Nortonechinus
†Notiocatillocrinus
†Notiocrinus
†Notoblastus
†Notocarpos
†Notocidaris
†Notocrinus
†Notolampas
†Noviaster
†Nowracrinus
†Nucleocrinus
†Nucleolites
†Nucleopygus
†Nudechinus
†Nudobrissus
†Nullamphiura
†Nummicrinus
†Nunnacrinus
†Nuxocrinus
†Nyctocrinus
†Nymphaeoblastus
†Nymphaster

O

†Occiducrinus
†Occultocystis
†Ochetes
†Oedematocidaris
†Oehlerticrinus
†Oenochoacrinus
†Offaster
†Ohiocrinus
†Oklahomacrinus
†Oklahomacystis
†Oligobrachyocrinus
†Oligophyma
†Oligoporus
†Oligopygus
†Oneirophanites
†Ontariocrinus
†Onychaster
†Onychocrinus
†Oocystis
†Oolopygus
†Opechinus
†Ophiacantha
†Ophiaulax
†Ophiocnida
†Ophiocoma
†Ophiocrinus
†Ophiocrossota
†Ophiocten
†Ophioglyphoida
†Ophiolancea
†Ophiomusium
†Ophiopetra
†Ophiopinna
†Ophiothrix
†Ophiotitanos
†Ophiotrigonum
†Ophioxenikos
†Ophiura
†Ophiurella
†Ophiurina
†Ophiuriocoma
†Ophiurocrinus
†Ophryaster
†Opisopneustes
†Opissaster
†Opsiocrinus
†Orbiblastus
†Orbignyana
†Orbignycrinus
†Orbitremites
†Ornaticannula
†Ornithaster
†Orocystites
†Orophocrinus
†Orthaster
†Orthocidaris
†Orthocrinus
†Orthogonocrinus
†Orthopsis
†Osculocystis
†Ossicrinus
†Osteocrinus
†Othneiocrinus
†Ottawacrinus
†Oustechnius
†Oviclypeus
†Ovocarpus
†Ovulaster
†Ovulechinus
†Ovulocystites
†Oxynocrinus

P

†Pabianocrinus
†Pachopsites
†Pachyblastus
†Pachycalix
†Pachycidaris
†Pachylocrinus
†Pachyocrinus
†Pagecrinus
†Paianocrinus
†Paiderocrinus
†Palaeantedon
†Palaeaster
†Palaechinus
†Palaeocoma
†Palaeocomaster
†Palaeocrinus
†Palaeocucumaria
†Palaeocystites
†Palaeodiadema
†Palaeodiscus
†Palaeoholopus
†Palaeopedina
†Palaeophiura
†Palaeosolaster
†Palaeostella
†Palaeostoma
†Palaeoypsilus
†Palaeura
†Palasterina
†Palasteriscus
†Palelpidia
†Paleochiridota
†Paleoctenodiscus
†Paleopneustes
†Paleosphaeronites
†Palhemiaster
†Palmeraster
†Palmerius
†Palmerocrinus
†Pandanocrinus
†Pandoracrinus
†Parabotryocrinus
†Parabrissus
†Parabursacrinus
†Paracatillocrinus
†Paracidaris
†Paraclidochirus
†Paracodaster
†Paracolocrinus
†Paracomatula
†Paracosmetocrinus
†Paracotylederma
†Paracremacrinus
†Paracrocrinus
†Paracromyocrinus
†Paractocrinus
†Paracucumarites
†Paracydonocrinus
†Paracymbiocrinus
†Paracystis
†Paradelocrinus
†Paradiabolocrinus
†Paradichocrinus
†Paradoxechinus
†Paradoxocrinus
†Paragammarocrinites
†Paragaricocrinus
†Paragassizocrinus
†Paragazacrinus
†Paragogia
†Paragonaster
†Paragraphiocrinus
†Paraheteraster
†Parahexacrinus
†Paramegaliocrinus
†Paramelocrinus
†Paramphicrinus
†Paranacystis
†Paranisocrinus
†Parapernerocrinus
†Parapisocrinus
†Paraplasocrinus
†Parapygus
†Pararchaeocrinus
†Parasalenia
†Parascutella
†Parascytalocrinus
†Parastachyocrinus
†Parastephanocrinus
†Paraster
†Parasycocrinus
†Paratalarocrinus
†Paratimorocidaris
†Parazeacrinites
†Parazophocrinus
†Paredriophus
†Pareocrinus
†Parethelocrinus
†Parhabdocidaris
†Parichthyocrinus
†Parindocrinus
†Pariocrinus
†Parisangulocrinus
†Parisocrinus
†Parmulechinus
†Paronaster
†Parorthocrinus
†Parspaniocrinus
†Parulocrinus
†Parvicidaris
†Parvioctoidus
†Parvispina
†Passalocrinus
†Patelliocrinus
†Paulocrinus
†Paurocidaris
†Pedatopriscus
†Pedina
†Pedinocrinus
†Pedinopsis
†Pedinothuria
†Pegaster
†Pegocrinus
†Pelanechinus
†Pelanodiadema
†Pelecocrinus
†Pelidocrinus
†Pellecrinus
†Peltacrinus
†Peltocystis
†Pemphocystis
†Penicillicrinus
†Peniculocrinus
†Pentablastus
†Pentacrinites
†Pentaramicrinus
†Pentasteria
†Pentececrinus
†Pentechinus
†Pentedium
†Pentephyllum
†Pentremites
†Pentremitidea
†Pentremoblastus
†Pepitaxoncrinus
†Peraspatangus
†Percevalicrinus
†Peremocrinus
†Periarchus
†Periaster
†Peribrissus
†Pericosmus
†Peridionites
†Periechocrinus
†Periglyptocrinus
†Perimestocrinus
†Perischocidaris
†Perischodomus
†Perissocrinus
†Perittoblastus
†Permaster
†Permiocrinus
†Permobrachypus
†Pernerocrinus
†Peronella
†Peronellites
†Perritocrinus
†Perunocrinus
†Petalambicrinus
†Petaloblastus
†Petalobrissus
†Petalocrinus
†Petalocystites
†Petraster
†Petrocrinus
†Petropegia
†Petschoracrinus
†Phacelocrinus
†Phaenoblastus
†Phaenoschisma
†Phalacrocidaris
†Phalacropedina
†Phanocrinus
†Pharaonaster
†Phillipaster
†Phillipsocrinus
†Phimocrinus
†Phlyctocystis
†Phocidaster
†Pholidechinus
†Pholidocidaris
†Phragmactis
†Phrygilocrinus
†Phyllacanthus
†Phyllobrissus
†Phyllocrinus
†Phyllocystis
†Phymechinus
†Phymopedina
†Phymosoma
†Phymotaxis
†Physaster
†Physetocrinus
†Pictaviechinus
†Pidelocrinus
†Pileus
†Pilidiocrinus
†Pilocrinus
†Pilocystites
†Pimlicocrinus
†Pirasocrinus
†Pirocystella
†Pisocrinus
†Pisolampas
†Pithocrinus
†Placoblastus
†Placocystella
†Placocystites
†Placometra
†Plagiobrissus
†Plagiochasma
†Plagiocrinus
†Planacrocrinus
†Platanaster
†Platipygus
†Platyacrocrinus
†Platybrissus
†Platycrinites
†Platycystites
†Platyfundocrinus
†Platyhexacrinus
†Plaxocrinus
†Playfordicrinus
†Plegiocidaris
†Pleiechinus
†Pleiocyphus
†Plemnocrinus
†Plesiaster
†Plesiastropecten
†Plesioastropecten
†Plesiocidaris
†Plesiocrinus
†Plesiolampas
†Plesiopatagus
†Plethoschisma
†Pleurocrinus
†Pleurocystites
†Pleurodiadema
†Pleuroschisma
†Plicatocrinus
†Plicodendrocrinus
†Pliolampas
†Plococidaris
†Plotocrinus
†Plumaster
†Plummericrinus
†Poculicrinus
†Poecilocrinus
†Pogonipocrinus
†Polusocrinus
†Polycidaris
†Polycosmites
†Polycrinus
†Polycyphus
†Polydeltoideus
†Polydesmaster
†Polydiadema
†Polygonocrinus
†Polypeltes
†Polyplacida
†Polyplacus
†Polyptychella
†Polysalenia
†Polytaxicidaris
†Polytryphocycloides
†Pomaster
†Pomatocrinus
†Porachistrum
†Porechinus
†Poriocidaris
†Poroblastus
†Porocidaris
†Porocrinus
†Poropeltaris
†Porosoma
†Porphyrocrinus
†Porpitella
†Postibulla
†Poteriocrinites
†Pourtalesia
†Pradesura
†Pradocrinus
†Praecaudina
†Praecupulocrinus
†Praedicticrinus
†Praeeuphronides
†Praeisselicrinus
†Praeorocrinus
†Praepleurocystis
†Pregazacrinus
†Premanicrinus
†Prenaster
†Prininocrinus
†Printechinus
†Prionechinus
†Prionocidaris
†Priscoligula
†Priscolongatus
†Priscopedatoides
†Priscopedatus
†Priscularites
†Proallosocrinus
†Proampelocrinus
†Proanisocrinus
†Proapsidocrinus
†Probletocrinus
†Prochauvelicystis
†Prochoidiocrinus
†Procidaris
†Procomaster
†Procothurnocystis
†Proctothylacocrinus
†Proescutella
†Proexenocrinus
†Progalliaecystis
†Progonechinus
†Prohexacrinus
†Proholaster
†Proholopus
†Proholothuria
†Proindocrinus
†Prokopicrinus
†Prokopicystis
†Prolobocrinus
†Promelocrinus
†Promopalaeaster
†Pronechinus
†Prophyllacanthus
†Prophyllocrinus
†Propoteriocrinus
†Proraster
†Prosostoma
†Protacrocrinus
†Protarthraster
†Protaster
†Protaxocrinus
†Protenaster
†Protencrinus
†Proterocidaris
†Proterocystites
†Protheelia
†Protobrissus
†Protocaudina
†Protocidaris
†Protocrinites
†Protocystis
†Protocystites
†Protocytidium
†Protolampas
†Protopalaeaster
†Protoscutella
†Protothyraster
†Protremaster
†Prowillungaster
†Prunocystites
†Psalidocrinus
†Psammechinus
†Psephechinus
†Psephoaster
†Pseudananchys
†Pseudarbacia
†Pseudarbacina
†Pseudarchaster
†Pseudaristocystis
†Pseudechinus
†Pseudholaster
†Pseudoantedon
†Pseudobrissus
†Pseudocentrotus
†Pseudocidaris
†Pseudocrinites
†Pseudodiadema
†Pseudodicoptella
†Pseudoexlinella
†Pseudoffaster
†Pseudogibbaster
†Pseudolinthia
†Pseudopedina
†Pseudopygaulus
†Pseudopygurus
†Pseudorthopsis
†Pseudosaccocoma
†Pseudosalenia
†Pseudosorella
†Pseudostaurocumites
†Pseudovictoriacystis
†Pseudowashitaster
†Psilocrinus
†Pskovicrinus
†Pterinocrinus
†Pterocoma
†Pterotoblastus
†Pterotocrinus
†Ptilonaster
†Ptychoblastus
†Ptychocosmites
†Ptychocrinus
†Pulaskicrinus
†Pumilindocrinus
†Punctatites
†Pusillaster
†Putilovocrinus
†Pycinaster
†Pycnocrinus
†Pycnosaccus
†Pygaster
†Pygaulus
†Pygecystis
†Pygidiolampas
†Pygmaeocrinus
†Pygomalus
†Pygopistes
†Pygopyrina
†Pygorhynchus
†Pygorhytis
†Pygospatangus
†Pygurostoma
†Pygurus
†Pyndaxocrinus
†Pyramiblastus
†Pyrenocrinus
†Pyrgocystis
†Pyrina
†Pyrocystites
†Pyxidocrinus

Q

†Quantoxocrinus
†Quenstedticrinus
†Quiniocrinus
†Quinquecaudex

R

†Rachiosoma
†Radiobrissus
†Radiocyphus
†Radiolus
†Ramacrinus
†Ramseyocrinus
†Ramulocrinus
†Ramusites
†Rasfacrinus
†Raymondicrinus
†Recrosalenia
†Rectitriordo
†Recurvaster
†Regnellicrinus
†Regnellicystis
†Regulaecystis
†Remesimetra
†Remisovicrinus
†Remondella
†Resetocrinus
†Reteocrinus
†Reticulocarpos
†Retusocrinus
†Revalocrinus
†Revalocystis
†Rhabdocidaris
†Rhabdocrinus
†Rhabdotites
†Rhachkicrinus
†Rhadinocrinus
†Rhaphaocrinus
†Rhenaster
†Rhenechinus
†Rhenocrinus
†Rhenocystis
†Rhenopyrgus
†Rheocrinus
†Rhipidocrinus
†Rhipidocystis
†Rhodanometra
†Rhodocrinites
†Rhopaloblastus
†Rhopalocoma
†Rhopalocrinus
†Rhopalocystis
†Rhopocrinus
†Rhopostoma
†Rhyncholampas
†Rhynchopygus
†Rhynobrissus
†Ridersia
†Rigaudites
†Rimosidocrinus
†Rispolia
†Ristnacrinus
†Roemerocrinus
†Roiometra
†Rojasia
†Rota
†Rotasaccus
†Rotula
†Rotuloidea
†Roveacrinoides
†Roveacrinus
†Royasendia
†Rumphia
†Rumphiocrinus
†Runa
†Rutroclypeus

S

†Sacariacrinus
†Saccocoma
†Saccosompsis
†Sacrinus
†Sagenocrinites
†Sagittoblastus
†Salenia
†Salenidia
†Salmacis
†Salteraster
†Samlandaster
†Sampsonocrinus
†Sanchezaster
†Sanchezella
†Santeelampas
†Sardinocrinus
†Sardocidaris
†Sarocrinus
†Savagella
†Savainiaster
†Scagliaster
†Scalenocystites
†Scammatocrinus
†Scaphechinus
†Scaptodiadema
†Schedexocrinus
†Schistocrinus
†Schizaster
†Schizechinus
†Schizoblastus
†Schizocrinus
†Schizocystis
†Schizopneustes
†Schizotremites
†Schlueterometra
†Schlumbergerites
†Schmidtocrinus
†Schoenaster
†Schondorfia
†Schuchertia
†Schuchertocystis
†Schultzicrinus
†Sciadiocrinus
†Sclerasterias
†Sclerocrinus
†Sclerothupites
†Scolechinus
†Scoliechinus
†Scoliocrinus
†Scoliocystis
†Scotiacrinus
†Scotiaecystis
†Scotocrinus
†Scutaster
†Scutella
†Scutellaster
†Scutellina
†Scutellinoides
†Scutulum
†Scyphocrinites
†Scytalocrinus
†Seirocrinus
†Sellardsicrinus
†Semiometra
†Semipetalion
†Semperites
†Senariocrinus
†Separocrinus
†Serendipocrinus
†Serpianotiaris
†Seunaster
†Shidianocrinus
†Shimantocrinus
†Shintocrinus
†Shroshaecrinus
†Siderocrinus
†Sievertsia
†Sievertsia
†Sigambrocrinus
†Silesiaster
†Silfonocrinus
†Siliesiacrinus
†Siluraster
†Silurocidaris
†Simocrinus
†Simplococrinus
†Sinaecidaris
†Sinclairocystis
†Singularocrinus
†Sinocrinus
†Sinocystis
†Sinoeocrinus
†Sinopetaloblastus
†Sinopetalocrinus
†Sinosura
†Siphonocrinus
†Sismondia
†Situlacrinus
†Skaiocrinus
†Sladenia
†Solanocrinites
†Solaster
†Sollasina
†Solonaerium
†Solopedatus
†Somalechinus
†Somaliaster
†Somphocrinus
†Sostronocrinus
†Souticrinus
†Spandelites
†Spaniaster
†Spaniocrinus
†Spaniocyphus
†Spatagoides
†Spatangomorpha
†Spatangus
†Spenceraster
†Spenceria
†Spermacystis
†Sphaerechinus
†Sphaeriaster
†Sphaeriodiscus
†Sphaerocrinus
†Sphaerocystites
†Sphaeronites
†Sphaeroschisma
†Sphaerotiaris
†Sphaerotocrinus
†Sphagoblastus
†Spheniscocrinus
†Spinopriscopedatus
†Spiraclavus
†Springeracrocrinus
†Springericrinus
†Springerocystis
†Spriocrinus
†Spyridiocrinus
†Stachyocrinus
†Stamnocrinus
†Staphylocrinus
†Stauranderaster
†Staurocumites
†Staurocystis
†Steganocrinus
†Stegaster
†Stegopygus
†Stelidiocrinus
†Stellarocrinus
†Stenaster
†Stenechinus
†Stenoaster
†Stenometra
†Stenopecrinus
†Stephanoblastus
†Stephanocrinus
†Stephanoura
†Stereoaster
†Stereobrachicrinus
†Stereocidaris
†Sternotaxis
†Stewbrecrinus
†Stibaraster
†Stibarocrinus
†Stichocystis
†Stichopitella
†Stichopites
†Stigmatopygus
†Stinocrinus
†Stipatocrinus
†Stiptocrinus
†Stirechinus
†Stiremetra
†Stomaporus
†Stomechinus
†Stomiocrinus
†Stomopneutes
†Storthingocrinus
†Strambergocrinus
†Streblocrinus
†Streptaster
†Streptocrinus
†Stribalocystites
†Strimplecrinus
†Strobilocystites
†Strobilothyone
†Strobocrinus
†Stromatocystites
†Strongyloblastus
†Strongylocentrotus
†Strongylocrinus
†Strotocrinus
†Struszocrinus
†Stuartwellercrinus
†Studeria
†Stueria
†Stuertzaster
†Stuertzura
†Stylocidaris
†Stylocrinus
†Styracocrinus
†Subarrectocrinus
†Sublobalocrinus
†Sucia
†Sundacrinus
†Sunwaptacrinus
†Sycocrinites
†Sygcaulocrinus
†Synaptites
†Synaptocrinus
†Synarmocrinus
†Synbathocrinus
†Synchirocrinus
†Syndetocrinus
†Synerocrinus
†Syntomocrinus
†Syntomospina
†Synyphocrinus
†Syringocrinus

T

†Taeniactis
†Taeniaster
†Tagenocrinus
†Taidocrinus
†Taimanawa
†Talarocrinus
†Tanablastus
†Tanaocystis
†Taphraster
†Tapinocrinus
†Tarachiocrinus
†Tarantocrinus
†Tarphypygus
†Tasmanicytidium
†Tasmanocrinus
†Tatechinus
†Tatonkacystis
†Taucatillocrinus
†Taurocrinus
†Taxocrinus
†Technocrinus
†Teichaster
†Teleiocrinus
†Telikosocrinus
†Teliocrinus
†Temnechinus
†Temnocidaris
†Temnocrinus
†Temnopleurus
†Temnotrema
†Tenagocrinus
†Tenuirachnius
†Termieria
†Terminaster
†Terocrinus
†Terpnocrinus
†Tesselaster
†Tessieria
†Testudinaster
†Tethyaster
†Tetrabrachiocrinus
†Tetracidaris
†Tetracionocrinus
†Tetracrinus
†Tetractocrinus
†Tetractocrinus
†Tetracystis
†Tetragonocrinus
†Tetragramma
†Tetramerocrinites
†Tetrapleurocrinus
†Tetraramania
†Tetravirga
†Texacrinus
†Thagastea
†Thalamocrinus
†Thallatocanthus
†Thallocrinus
†Thaminocrinus
†Thamnocrinus
†Thaumatoblastus
†Theelia
†Theleproktocrinus
†Theloreus
†Thenarocrinus
†Thetidicrinus
†Thierychinus
†Thiolliericrinus
†Tholaster
†Tholocrinus
†Tholocystis
†Thomacystis
†Thomasocrinus
†Thoralicystis
†Thresherodiscus
†Thuringocrinus
†Thylacocrinus
†Thylechinus
†Thyridocrinus
†Tiaracrinus
†Tiarechinopsis
†Tiarechinus
†Tiaridia
†Tiaromma
†Timeischytes
†Timorechinus
†Timoroblastus
†Tirocrinus
†Titanaster
†Tithonia
†Togocyamus
†Tormoblastus
†Tornatilicrinus
†Tornquistellus
†Torrocrinus
†Torynocrinus
†Totiglobus
†Tournoueraster
†Toxaster
†Toxopatagus
†Toxopneustes
†Trachelocrinus
†Trachypatagus
†Trampidocrinus
†Traskocrinus
†Traumatocrinus
†Trautscholdicrinus
†Tremataster
†Trematocystis
†Treocrinus
†Tretocidaris
†Triacrinus
†Triadechinus
†Triadocidaris
†Triassicidaris
†Triboloporus
†Tribrachyocrinus
†Triceracrinus
†Trichasteropsis
†Trichinocrinus
†Trichocrinus
†Trichotocrinus
†Tricoelocrinus
†Tricosmites
†Trimeraster
†Trimerocrinus
†Trinalicrinus
†Tripatocrinus
†Triplacidia
†Tripneustes
†Tripylus
†Triradites
†Trisalenia
†Trochalosoma
†Trochocrinites
†Trochocrinites
†Trochocystites
†Trochocystoides
†Trochodiadema
†Trochoechinus
†Trochotiara
†Troosticrinus
†Trophocrinus
†Tropidaster
†Trybliocrinus
†Trypherocrinus
†Tryssocrinus
†Tulipacrinus
†Tundracrinus
†Tunguskocrinus
†Tunisiacrinus
†Turanglaster
†Turbocrinus
†Tylasteria
†Tylocidaris
†Tympanoblastus
†Typanocrinus
†Tyrieocrinus
†Tyrolecrinus
†Tyrridiocystis

U

†Uintacrinus
†Ulocrinus
†Ulrichaster
†Ulrichicrinus
†Ulrichidiscus
†Ulrichocystis
†Umbocrinus
†Uncinulina
†Uncinuloides
†Unibothriocidaris
†Unifascia
†Uniramosa
†Uperocrinus
†Urasterella
†Ureocrinus
†Urosoma
†Utharocrinus
†Uyguroblastus

V

†Vadarocrinus
†Valettaster
†Valsalenia
†Vandelcoaster
†Vaquerosella
†Vasocrinus
†Verbeekia
†Vernius
†Vertigocrinus
†Vicetiametra
†Victoriacystis
†Victoriaster
†Villebrunaster
†Vinchuscanchaia
†Virucrinus
†Vizcainocarpus
†Volchovia
†Vologesia
†Vomeraster
†Vosekocrinus
†Vostocovacrinus

W

†Wachsmuthicrinus
†Walcottidiscus
†Wacrinus
†Wannerocrinus
†Washitaster
†Weisbordella
†Wellerocystis
†Westgardella
†Westheadocrinus
†Wetherbyocrinus
†Whiteocrinus
†Willmanocystis
†Willungaster
†Wilsonicrinus
†Winkleria
†Woodocrinus
†Worthenocrinus
†Wrightia
†Wrightocrinus
†Wuarnia
†Wythella

X

†Xandarosaster
†Xanthamphiura
†Xenaster
†Xenechinus
†Xenoblastus
†Xenocatillocrinus
†Xenocidaris
†Xenocrinus
†Xenocystites
†Xinjiangoblastus
†Xisoallogecrinus
†Xyeleblastus
†Xysmacrinus
†Xysteria

Y

†Yachalicystis
†Yakovlevicrinus
†Yarravaster

Z

†Zardinechinus
†Zeacrinites
†Zenkericrinus
†Zenocentrotus
†Zenocrinus
†Zeuglopleurus
†Zeugopleurus
†Zeusocrinus
†Zirocrinus
†Zophocrinus
Zoroaster
†Zostocrinus
†Zuffardia
†Zumoffenia
†Zygocycloides
†Zygotocrinus

See also
Echinoderms
Crinoids

References
Uncited genera can be attributed to:

External links
The Paleobiology Database's entry on "Echinodermata"

 List of
Echinoderms